Gezer Regional Council (Mo'atza Azorit Gezer) is a regional council in the Central District of Israel. Established in 1949, it had a population of 20,700 in 2006.

List of settlements
The council covers five kibbutzim, 15 moshavim, and five community settlements.

Kibbutzim
Gezer
Hulda
Na'an
Netzer Sereni
Sha'alvim

Moshavim
Azaria
Beit Uziel
Ganei Yohanan
Kfar Ben Nun
Kfar Bilu
Kfar Shmuel
Matzliah
Mishmar Ayalon
Pedaya
Petahya
Ramot Meir
Sitria
Yad Rambam
Yashresh
Yatzitz

Community settlements
Beit Hashmonay
Ganei Hadar
Karmei Yosef
Mishmar David
Nof Ayalon

Twin cities
 Leawood, Kansas, United States
 Grimma, Germany

External links
Official website 

 
Regional councils in Israel
Central District (Israel)